Savigliano (Savijan in Piedmontese) is a comune of Piedmont, northern Italy, in the Province of Cuneo, about  south of Turin by rail.

It is home to ironworks, foundries, locomotive works (once owned by Fiat Ferroviaria, now by Alstom) and silk manufactures, as well as sugar factories, printing works and cocoon-raising establishments.

Main sights 

Savigliano retains some traces of its ancient walls, demolished in 1707, and has a  collegiate church (S. Andrea, in its present form comparatively modern), and a triumphal arch erected in honour of the marriage of Charles Emmanuel I with Infanta Catherine of Austrian Spain.

There is also a train museum exhibiting numerous Italian past trains and locomotives.

Notable people
Elena Busso, volleyball player
Giovanni Schiaparelli, astronomer
Santorre di Santarosa, an Italian Philhellene
Luca Filippi, racing driver

Twin towns 
  Pylos, Greece, since 1962
  Mormanno, Italy, since 1962
 Villa María, Argentina, since 2000

References

External links 

 

Cities and towns in Piedmont